Boris v. Ken: How Boris Johnson Won London is a 2008 book by Giles Edwards and Jonathan Isaby about the 2008 London mayoral election.

Background
Ken Livingstone won the 2000 London mayoral election as a left-wing independent against the official Labour Party candidate. Livingstone was readmitted to the Labour Party and won the 2004 election for Labour. In 2008, Boris Johnson became the first Conservative mayor of London after triumphing against Livingstone. The book examines the campaign. The book was referenced in the academic work, The Conservative Party: From Thatcher to Cameron and was placed on a reading list issued to Conservative MPs.

Reception
In Total Politics magazine, Keith Simpson wrote 'Basically, this book tells the story of how Boris won and why Ken lost. The authors conclude by considering the impact on national politics of the election of Mayor Boris, not least in what they believe could become a rivalry between Boris and David Cameron', while in Progress magazine Peter Kellner described the book as a 'brisk and highly readable narrative' and noting 'The swing to the Conservatives was significantly less in London than in the local elections elsewhere in England'.

The book was also featured on BBC Parliament.

References

2008 non-fiction books
Politics of London
Books about London
Books about politics of the United Kingdom
Non-fiction books about elections
2008 in British politics
Boris Johnson